The 1999–2000 Pepperdine Waves men's basketball team represented Pepperdine University in the 1999–2000 NCAA Division I men's basketball season. The team was led by first-year head coach Jan van Breda Kolff. The Waves played their home games at the Firestone Fieldhouse and were members of the West Coast Conference. They finished the season 25–9, 12–2 in WCC play to win the regular season conference title. Pepperdine lost in the championship game of the West Coast Conference tournament, but did receive an at-large bid to the NCAA tournament as No. 11 seed in the East region. In the opening round, the Waves surprised No. 6 seed Indiana – in what would be head coach Bobby Knight’s final game at the school – before falling to Oklahoma State in the second round, 75–67.

Roster

Source

Schedule and results

|-
!colspan=9 style=| Non-conference regular season

|-
!colspan=9 style=| WCC Regular Season

|-
!colspan=9 style=| WCC tournament

|-
!colspan=9 style=| NCAA tournament

Source

References

Pepperdine Waves men's basketball seasons
Pepperdine
Pepperdine
Pepperdine Waves Men's Basketball
Pepperdine Waves Men's Basketball